The  is an art gallery in Meguro, Tokyo, Japan.

The building was opened in November 1987. Designed by Nihon Sekkei, it is of reinforced concrete construction, with one basement floor and three floors above ground, and has floor space of 4059 square metres.

The permanent collection of the gallery includes works by such artists as Tsuguharu Fujita, Zenzōrō Kojima, Shikanosuke Oka, Kazuo Sakata, and Kumi Sugai.

The museum is at Meguro 2–4–36, Meguro-ku, Tokyo, a ten-minute walk from Meguro Station.

The museum holds frequent exhibitions.

References

External links
Meguro Museum of Art, Tokyo 

Art museums and galleries in Tokyo
Modern art museums in Japan
Art museums established in 1987
Buildings and structures in Meguro
1987 establishments in Japan